Greatest Hits and Rare Classics is a compilation album by Rare Earth released February 26, 1991, by Motown Records. Three of these songs were top ten hits with a total of eight charting on the Billboard Hot 100 when originally released.

Critical reception

Andrew Hamilton reviewing the album for AllMusic writes, "This collection is marred by abbreviated versions of "Get Ready," "I Know I'm Losing You," and others. For fans who didn't purchase individual albums, though, this is a good overall view of their work." He concludes with, "Lead singer Peter Hoorelbeke had a powerful voice that didn't take a backseat to anybody's. Imagine if they had cut "War," and why didn't they?"

Track listing

Track information and credits adapted from the album's liner notes.

Musicians

Rare Earth (Lineups are only of members during the period these tracks were recorded)
Gil Bridges – Saxophone, flute, background vocals (1960-current)
Rod Richards – Lead guitars, backing vocals (1960-1971)
Kenny James – Keyboards (1960-1971)
John Persh – Bass, trombone, background vocals (1960-1972)
Peter Hoorelbeke – Drums, lead vocals (1960-1974, 1976-1983)
Eddie Guzman – Percussion (1969-1993)
Ray Monette – Lead guitars, background vocals (1971-1976, 1977–2004, 2009-current)
Mike Urso –  Bass, background vocals (1972-1974, 1976–1979, 1981-1983)
Mark Olson – Keyboards, backing vocals (1971-1974, 1977-1986)

Production
Producers
William "Smokey" Robinson (track 1)
Tom Baird (tracks 2, 4–7, 9, 11)
Rare Earth (tracks 7-11, 20)
Norman Whitfield (tracks 3, 12, 18-19)
Frank Wilson (Track 13)
John Ryan (tracks 14-15)
Stewart Levine (tracks 16-17)
Compilation
Produced by George Soloman
Mastered by John Matousek

References

External links
Rare Earth Official Site
Motown Records Official Site

1991 compilation albums
Rare Earth (band) albums
Motown compilation albums